Huddersfield Town's 1927–28 campaign was the last season of Town's true dominance of English football. They finished 2nd behind Everton, although if they had won all their last 3 games, they would have won the title, but they only beat Portsmouth and lost to Sheffield United and Aston Villa. They also reached their 3rd FA Cup Final, losing to Blackburn Rovers in controversial circumstances.

Squad at the start of season

Review
Town's team of the mid 1920s were all-conquering, almighty and described as the best team in the world. Just 1 season after relinquishing their championship title, but they were still a formidable force in the 1st Division. This was proven by their record 8-2 win over Cardiff City in October and the 7-1 win over Sheffield United in November. George Brown still continued his goalscoring exploits by scoring 35 goals during the season, including 27 in the league. They were still in the hunt for the title until late April. They needed to win their last 3 games to have a realistic chance of reclaiming their title, but defeats to Sheffield United and Aston Villa made the win over Portsmouth irrelevant. They missed out on the championship by 2 points to Everton.

Squad at the end of the season

Results

Division One

FA Cup

Appearances and goals

Huddersfield Town A.F.C. seasons
Huddersfield Town